The War That Came Early is a six-novel series by Harry Turtledove depicting an alternate history of World War II. As is typical of Turtledove's alternate histories, the narrative follows a large cast of both fictional and historical characters.

Points of divergence

The series's initial point of divergence occurs when Spanish Nationalist leader José Sanjurjo avoids the plane crash that took his life in reality. While Sanjurjo's rule starts on a similar path to that of Francisco Franco, he later aligns Spain with the Axis powers and occupies Gibraltar (which Franco carefully avoided doing in actual history).

A second divergence occurs when British and French appeasement at the Munich Conference leads Adolf Hitler to decide that he should attack while his opponents are unprepared; he gets his casus belli when Konrad Henlein is assassinated by a fictional Czech nationalist. As a result, World War II starts in 1938 with a German invasion of Czechoslovakia rather than Poland, still drawing in Britain and France through treaty obligations, with both sides far less prepared for war than they were in 1939.

Hitler's War

The first book in the series covers autumn 1938 to spring 1939.

After an initial tenacious resistance to the German army, subsequent Polish and Hungarian invasions combined with a Slovak rebellion lead to Czechoslovakia's collapse, with France and the Soviet Union unable to offer significant assistance. The Spanish Civil War, which has not yet ended in 1938, settles into a stalemate as both sides' foreign allies turn their attention to the larger war. Sanjurjo's decision to seize Gibraltar ties Spain to the Axis side.

When the anticommunist Polish government also decides to side with Germany, war erupts with the USSR. Both the Germans and Soviets find themselves in two-front wars as the Soviets attack west and the Japanese invade Siberia. In response, Germany launches its own westward offensive to knock France out of the war. The German forces are not as overwhelming as they would have been with another year of preparation, and some are also tied down in the Eastern Front, so the British and French armies are able to hold the line outside Paris.

Discontent grows within the German army as the Western Front is threatened and has achieved little strategically, while dissatisfaction with Hitler's rash decision in starting the war leads to a purge of the officer corps. At home, although no Kristallnacht occurs, discrimination and persecution against German Jews continues to grow.

West and East

The second book focuses on the stalemates that have developed all across Europe. In the Russian Far East, the Japanese are able to sever the Trans-Siberian Railway, but cold weather, mosquitoes, and bloody assaults cause high casualties on both sides. Tension mounts between American forces stationed in China and the Japanese Army. Germany is able to gain ground in Scandinavia and introduces the new Panzer III tank, but both the British and French and the Soviets are able to mount major offensives that push toward the German border.

The Big Switch

The third book's title refers to Britain and France joining Germany's side against the Soviet Union. After Winston Churchill dies in a car accident, Rudolf Hess is able to convince the two allies to send their armies into the Soviet Union. The German Army withdraws from France; the Czechoslovak exiles, betrayed by the Allies, retreat to Republican Spain, while the United States abandons its Lend Lease support for Britain and France. Soviet forces retreat into their own territory as the winter starts. Jews in the conquered lands are harshly oppressed, although those in Poland are exempt as they are allies of Germany. Japan finally takes Vladivostok and makes peace with the USSR. The United States enacts an embargo against Japan; in response, Japan attacks British, French, Dutch, and American targets across the Pacific on January 12, 1941.

Coup d'État

The fourth book covers a coup in Britain that turns them against their allies. The Japanese gain ground throughout the Pacific and southeast Asia and bloody the American Pacific Fleet through air attacks, forcing them to retreat to Pearl Harbor.

Two Fronts

The fifth book spans from 1942 to early 1943. Having once again switched sides, the British and French have reopened the Western Front and are also fighting the Germans and Italians in North Africa. Because of the shift in German resources, the Red Army is finally able to break through and liberate Belarus and Ukraine near the end of the book. In the Pacific theater, Japan attempts a biological attack on Hawaii. President Roosevelt cuts government funding for the Manhattan Project.

Last Orders

The last book takes place from late 1943 to 1944. After a coup in Germany takes Hitler's life, a new non-Nazi military dictatorship led by General Heinz Guderian negotiates an end to the European war; the Allies allow Germany to retain Czechoslovakia and the Soviet Union the Baltic states. Germany remains the dominant military power of Europe, and unlike the interwar period, no limitations are placed on its armaments. Since the US abandoned its own nuclear program, Einstein is worried that Germany – though no longer Nazi but still nationalist and militaristic – might be the first to gain nuclear arms. Britain is also under military rule, while Spain is united under the Republicans. The war against Japan is not over, however, and Stalin moves troops to the Far East while concluding an alliance with the United States.

References

External links

Novels by Harry Turtledove
American alternate history novels
Alternate history book series
American historical novels
American political novels
Jewish American novels
Alternate Nazi Germany novels
Fiction set in 1938
Fiction set in 1939
Fiction set in 1940
Fiction set in 1941
Fiction set in 1942
Fiction set in 1943
Fiction set in 1944
Cultural depictions of Gavrilo Princip